Yaaron Ki Baraat is an Indian Hindi talk television series which premiered on 8 October 2016 on Zee TV. The last episode was telecast on 11 December 2016.

Overview
Yaaron Ki Baraat was a Hindi chat show hosted by Sajid Khan and Riteish Deshmukh. The show invited two celebrity guests every weekend to talk about their bond. The first episode featured Amitabh Bachchan and Shatrughan Sinha.

Celebrity guest
Amitabh Bachchan and Shatrughan Sinha
Farah Khan and Karan Johar
Parineeti Chopra and Sania Mirza
Yuvraj Singh and Harbhajan Singh
Varun Dhawan and Arjun Kapoor
Vishal Dadlani and Shekhar Ravjiani and Sunidhi Chauhan
Jackie Shroff and Sunil Shetty
Shraddha Kapoor and Farhan Akhtar
Ajay Devgn and Sanjay Dutt and Abhishek Bachchan
Shah Rukh Khan and  Anushka Sharma
Vivek Oberoi and Aftab Shivdasani
Boman Irani and Rajkumar Hirani
Himesh Reshammiya and Shaan
Huma Qureshi and Saqib Saleem
Vidya Balan and Sujoy Ghosh
Sanjay Kapoor and Arbaaz Khan and Chunky Pandey
Akshay Kumar and Sajid Nadiawala

Host
Sajid Khan
Riteish Deshmukh

References

External links 

 Official Website on ZEE5

2016 Indian television series debuts
Hindi-language television shows
Indian television talk shows
Television shows set in Mumbai
Zee TV original programming